Miihkali Teppo (born December 28, 1992) is a Finnish ice hockey defenceman. He is currently playing with HIFK in the Finnish Liiga.

Teppo made his Liiga debut playing with HIFK during the 2013–14 Liiga season.

References

External links

1992 births
Living people
Finnish ice hockey defencemen
HIFK (ice hockey) players
Ice hockey people from Helsinki